Calgary-Mountain View is a provincial electoral district in Calgary, Alberta, Canada, mandated to return a single member to the Legislative Assembly of Alberta using the first past the post method of voting. The district was created in 1971 and is currently represented by Kathleen Ganley of the Alberta New Democratic Party.

History
The electoral district was created in the 1971 boundary redistribution from parts of Calgary North and Calgary East.

Following the 2004 Alberta boundary re-distribution Calgary-Mountain View had a population of 39,586, which was 10.1 per cent above the provincial average of 35,951, which was the highest deviation for an electoral district in Calgary or Edmonton.

The 2010 Alberta boundary re-distribution all land west of Shaganappi Trail was redistricted into Calgary-Varsity. Following the 2010 re-distribution, the Calgary-Mountain View had a population of 42,092, which was 2.96 per cent above the provincial average of 40,880.

Boundary history

Representation history

The electoral district was created in the 1971 boundary redistribution out of Calgary East and Calgary North. The predecessor riding's that comprised Mountain View had returned Social Credit candidates since they were created. The first election held that year returned former Calgary East Social Credit MLA Albert Ludwig back to the Assembly with over half of the popular vote.

Mountain View would see its first change of hands in the 1975 election as Progressive Conservative candidate John Kushner defeated Ludwig. He retired at dissolution of the Assembly in 1979 as he got the federal Progressive Conservative nomination for Calgary East to run in the 1979 federal election.

The provincial election that year would return another Kushner to represent Mountain View. This time it was Stan Kushner, son of John Kushner. He held the district for the Progressive Conservatives winning a majority of 55% of the vote. In 1981 he was charged with drunk driving. Kushner did not run for a second term. The 1982 election returned Progressive Conservative candidate Bohdan Zip who also only served a single term in office.

In the 1986 general election voters would return NDP candidate Bob Hawkesworth over future Premier of Alberta Jim Prentice in a hotly contested race. He was re-elected in 1989 with a solid majority.

Hawkesworth would be defeated after two terms in the 1993 election by Progressive Conservative candidate Mark Hlady. He would win two more terms with increasing percentage of the vote in 1997 and 2001. In 2004 he was defeated by Liberal candidate David Swann.

Swann was re-elected to his second term in 2008 and became Leader of the Liberals after Kevin Taft resigned. He would resign the post himself in 2011 and be replaced by Raj Sherman.

Legislature results

Graphical Summary

1971 general election

1975 general election

1979 general election

1982 general election

1986 general election

1989 general election

1993 general election

1997 general election

2001 general election

2004 general election

2008 general election

2012 general election

2015 general election

2019 general election

Senate nominee results

2004 Senate nominee election district results

Voters had the option of selecting 4 Candidates on the Ballot

2012 Senate nominee election district results

Student Vote

2004 student election

On November 19, 2004 a Student Vote was conducted at participating Alberta schools to parallel the 2004 Alberta general election results. The vote was designed to educate students and simulate the electoral process for persons who have not yet reached the legal majority. The vote was conducted in 80 of the 83 provincial electoral districts with students voting for actual election candidates. Schools with a large student body that reside in another electoral district had the option to vote for candidates outside of the electoral district then where they were physically located.

See also
List of Alberta provincial electoral districts

References

Further reading

External links
Elections Alberta
The Legislative Assembly of Alberta

Alberta provincial electoral districts
Politics of Calgary